Khovd River is a river in Mongolia. It flows from Tavan Bogd mountain of the Altai Mountains to Khar-Us Lake. The length of the river is 516 kilometres.

See also 
List of rivers of Mongolia

References

Rivers of Mongolia